Aremberg() is a municipality in the district of Ahrweiler, in Rhineland-Palatinate, Germany.

Nearby are the ruins of Aremberg Castle, once a mighty fortress, on the summit of the Aremberg.

References

Populated places in Ahrweiler (district)